Dick Stein is the state representative for the 54th District of the Ohio House of Representatives. He is a Republican. The district consists of Huron County as well as Rochester, Wellington, LaGrange, Eaton Estates, Avon and portions of North Ridgeville in Lorain County.

Life and career
Stein was born and raised in Norwalk, Ohio, where he still resides today.  A business owner, Stein has owned Stein Photography for nearly forty years. He is a graduate of Norwalk St. Paul High School, and also holds various photography licenses.

Prior to running for office, Stein was a longtime member of the Huron County Republican Party Central Committee. Stein and his wife, Patty, has two children and five grandchildren.

Ohio House of Representatives
In 2016, state Representative Terry Boose was unable to run for another term due to term-limits. A competitive seat on paper, both Democrats and Republicans made the seat a top target. On the Republican side, Stein was one of four to seek the GOP nomination, besting Kathryn Frombaugh and two others with 34% of the vote to take the nomination.

Facing Democrat Tom Dunlap, a Huron County Commissioner, Stein won the general election 62% to 38%.  He was sworn in on January 3, 2017.

References

External links
Ohio State Representative Dick Stein official site

Living people
Republican Party members of the Ohio House of Representatives
21st-century American politicians
People from Norwalk, Ohio
Year of birth missing (living people)